Secret, Profane & Sugarcane is the 2009 studio album by Elvis Costello. It was recorded in Nashville with American songwriter and producer T Bone Burnett, and released on 9 June 2009 on the Hear Music label. The album features bluegrass, Americana and country music along with Costello's familiar garrulous lyrics.

Secret, Profane & Sugarcane entered the UK album charts at number 71, where it spent one week before dropping out of the top 100. It was far more successful in the US, when it charted at number 13 on the Billboard 200.

The artwork was designed by comic strip artist Tony Millionaire.

Background
In the albums before Secret, Profane & Sugarcane, Costello had experimented with various styles of music including jazz, classical and others. For this album, Costello returned to an acoustic band set-up for the first time since 1986's King of America album. Recorded in Nashville, Tennessee in three days, Costello's 29th studio album was released on Starbucks' Hear Music label to generally good critical acclaim.

Critical response

Critics looked upon Secret, Profane & Sugarcane in a generally very favourable way with some exceptions. Reviewing for Rolling Stone, Jody Rosen said that Costello was "in one of his comfort zones" and had made a "tight, uncluttered" album. Bud Scoppa, reviewing the album for Uncut, gave it a four-star rating, saying it was a "rootsy beauty" and "...his most engaging album in a very long time". In a more dismissive review, Pitchfork Media gave the album a 3.8 out of 10, and called the album "yet another entry in Costello's string of gestural albums"
.

Track listing

Personnel
The following people contributed to Secret, Profane & Sugarcane:

Elvis Costello – acoustic guitar, vocals
T Bone Burnett – electric guitar, production
Jeff Taylor – accordion
Mike Compton – mandolin
Dennis Crouch – double bass
Jerry Douglas – dobro
Stuart Duncan – banjo, fiddle
Emmylou Harris – harmony vocals
Jim Lauderdale – harmony vocals

Charts

References

External links
 
Official Elvis Costello website

2009 albums
Elvis Costello albums
Albums produced by Elvis Costello
Albums produced by T Bone Burnett